Derek Watson (6 November 1948 – 17 September 2018) was a Scottish musicologist, actor, musician and bookseller. He has been described as a Scottish cultural icon.

Acting career
Watson began work at the Citizens Theatre in 1972. He was initially brought into the company as the musical director of the 1972 Christmas panto. It was a position he would hold until his retirement in the process becoming affectionately known "Uncle Derek". After appearing on the Citz stage in non-speaking roles, his first speaking role was in Bertol Brecht's Puntila and his Servant Matti. He went on to appear in more than 60 shows.

Music and writings
Watson composed his first piece, a symphonic poem entitled The Battle of Bannockburn at the age of eight. He was sent to piano lessons, and by the time he was 11 had composed his second symphonic poem, The Romans in Britain. He was a music graduate of Edinburgh University and the Royal Academy of Music, London.

Watson contributed two volumes to the Master Musicians series of books. These were tomes on Anton Bruckner in 1975, and Franz Liszt in 1989. In 1979 he also wrote a major biography of Richard Wagner. To mark the 2003 Scottish Opera production of Der Ring des Nibelungen Watson wrote a version of the story for children.

The Wagner Society of Scotland
In 1984, Watson was the prime mover in the foundation what was then the Scottish branch of the London Wagner Society. As chairman, Watson oversaw a declaration of independence in 1996 that saw the organisation become the Wagner Society of Scotland. He remained in post as chair until 2013.

Book shop proprietor
In 1994, having been a resident in West Linton for a decade, he opened Linton Books. Once he had retired from the theatre, the shop provided him with an alternative stage, ‘playing’ the proprietor of the shop to entertain customers. Book signings by authors included Alexander McCall Smith, whose second novel in the Sunday Philosophy Club series, Friends, Lovers, Chocolate, published in 2005, found the book's heroine Isabel Dalhousie visiting Derek in his capacity as bookseller. The shop itself featured during the unravelling of the story's mystery.

Death
Watson died in Edinburgh Royal Infirmary after a brief illness. In November 2019, a memorial event was held for him Oran Mor, Glasgow.

References

External links
 The Wagner Society of Scotland

Scottish classical composers
Scottish male stage actors
Liszt scholars
Wagner scholars

1948 births
2018 deaths